The women's shot put at the 2017 World Championships in Athletics was held at the Olympic Stadium on .

Summary
The entire final was conducted in rainy conditions. Five throws in, Gong Lijiao took the early lead with a throw of 19.16 metres. Michelle Carter moved into second with 18.82 metres. Near the beginning of the second round, Anita Márton edged ahead with 18.89 metres, Gong improved to 19.35 metres, then Carter improved to 18.86 metres. In the third round, Carter improved to 19.14 metres to go back to second position. The leader board stayed that way until the fifth round when Gong improved to a winning 19.94 metres. In the final round, Márton threw 19.49 metres to take silver.

Records
Before the competition records were as follows:

No records were set at the competition.

Qualification standard
The standard to qualify automatically for entry was 17.75 metres.

Schedule
The event schedule, in local time (UTC+1), is as follows:

Results

Qualification
The qualification round took place on 8 August, in two groups, both starting at 20:39. Athletes attaining a mark of at least 18.30 metres ( Q ) or at least the 12 best performers ( q ) qualified for the final. The overall results were as follows:

Final
The final took place on 9 August at 20:25. The overall results were as follows:

References

=

Shot put
Shot put at the World Athletics Championships
2017 in women's athletics